Tom Schwedhelm is an American politician and former police officer who has served as the mayor of Santa Rosa, California since December 2018.

Education 
Schwedhelm an Associate Degree from Santa Rosa Junior College in administration of justice, followed by a Bachelor of Science in business management from Saint Mary's College of California. He then earned a Master of Arts in psychology from Sonoma State University.

Career 
Schwedhelm began his career as an officer for the Santa Rosa Police Department in 1983, retiring in 2013. He was also an adjunct faculty member at Sonoma State University from 1985 to 2002. In 2014, He was elected to the Santa Rosa City Council. He was selected as mayor by the council in 2018, replacing Chris Coursey after then end of his two-year term.

References 

Living people
Mayors of places in California
People from Santa Rosa, California
Year of birth missing (living people)
Sonoma State University faculty
Sonoma State University alumni
Saint Mary's College of California alumni
Santa Rosa Junior College alumni